Antao D'Souza (born 17 January 1939) is a Pakistani former cricketer who played in six Tests for the Pakistan cricket team, from 1959 to 1962. He was the second Christian from four Christians to play Test cricket for Pakistan. He was a medium pace bowler and obdurate tail-end batsman.

Born and raised in Nagoa, Salcete, Goa (at the time part of Portuguese India), D'Souza's father emigrated to Karachi, Pakistan, at the time of independence in 1947, where D'Souza attended St Patrick's High School. His brothers, Vincent D'Souza and Joseph D'Souza, also played first-class cricket.

D'Souza toured England in 1962, heading the batting averages (53) as he remained not out in five of his six innings. His bowling was as ineffective as everyone else on that tour, which Pakistan lost 0–4. Domestically, D'Souza played for Pakistan International Airlines, Karachi Blues, Karachi, and Peshawar.

Given a minimum of ten innings, D'Souza is one of only two Test cricketers whose batting averages exceeded their highest score.  The other was the Indian cricketer Sadashiv Shinde.

In 1999, D'Souza migrated with his wife and their four children to Ontario, Canada.

References

1939 births
Karachi cricketers
Living people
Pakistan Test cricketers
Pakistan International Airlines cricketers
Pakistani emigrants to Canada
Peshawar cricketers
St. Patrick's High School, Karachi alumni
Pakistani cricketers
Cricketers from Karachi
Karachi Blues cricketers
Karachi C cricketers
Karachi A cricketers
Pakistan Eaglets cricketers
Pakistani people of Goan descent
People from South Goa district
Canadian people of Goan descent
Canadian sportspeople of Indian descent
Pakistani Roman Catholics